Alice Mary Hughes (1857–1939) was a leading London portrait photographer specializing in images of fashionable women and children.

Biography 
Hughes was the eldest daughter of the portrait painter Edward Hughes (1832-1908). After studying photography at the London Polytechnic she opened a studio in 1891 next to her father's in Gower Street, London which she operated until December 1910. In her day, she was a leading photographer of royalty, fashionable women and children producing elegant platinotype prints. During her most successful periods, she employed up to 60 women and took up to 15 sittings a day.  In 1914, for a short period before the First World War, she ran a business in Berlin but returned to London at the beginning of the war, opening a studio in Ebury Street in 1915. The Ebury Street studio was not as successful as her first business and she closed it in 1933, retiring to Worthing where she died after a fall in her bedroom in 1939.

From 1898 to 1909, she contributed several hundred portraits to Country Life. In 1910, she sold 50,000 negatives to Speaight Ltd.

Assessment 
A pioneer of portrait photography, Hughes developed a distinctive style "by fusing the conventions of society portraiture with the cool, monochromatic tones of the platinum print." (From Oxford Dictionary of National Biography.)

Gallery

References

Further reading 

 
 

British portrait photographers
1857 births
1939 deaths
19th-century English photographers
19th-century English women artists
20th-century English women artists
19th-century women photographers
20th-century women photographers
English women photographers
Photographers from London